City Park is a 1934 American comedy drama film directed by Richard Thorpe and starring Sally Blane, Henry B. Walthall and Matty Kemp.

Cast
 Sally Blane as Rose Wentworth  
 Henry B. Walthall as Colonel Henry Randolph Ransome  
 Matty Kemp as Raymond Ransome  
 Hale Hamilton as Herbert Ransome 
 John Harron as Charlie Hooper  
 Claude King as General Horace G. Stevens  
 Gwen Lee as Maizie, the Hooker  
 Judith Vosselli as Mrs. Herbert Ransome  
 Wilson Benge as Andrew Cook  
 Lafe McKee as Matt O'Donnell  
 Mary Foy as Mrs. Guppy, Landlady 
 Ted Billings as Man in Park  
 Bess Flowers as Stevens' Secretary  
 Frank LaRue as Detective  
 Hattie McDaniel as Tessie - the Ransome Maid  
 Lee Phelps as Plainclothesman in Park  
 Eddie Phillips as Pool Shark  
 Lloyd Whitlock as District Attorney

References

Bibliography
 Michael R. Pitts. Poverty Row Studios, 1929–1940: An Illustrated History of 55 Independent Film Companies, with a Filmography for Each. McFarland & Company, 2005.

External links
 

1934 films
1934 comedy-drama films
American comedy-drama films
Films directed by Richard Thorpe
Chesterfield Pictures films
American black-and-white films
1930s English-language films
1930s American films